Morigi is a Papuan language of southern Papua New Guinea.

References

Kiwaian languages
Languages of Western Province (Papua New Guinea)